Lloyd Center is a shopping mall in the Lloyd District of Portland, Oregon, United States, just northeast of downtown.  It is owned by Arrow Retail of Dallas.  The mall features three floors of shopping, with the third level serving mostly as professional office spaces, a food court, and U.S. Education Corporation's Carrington College. Lloyd Center also includes the Lloyd Center Ice Skating Rink, which has become the main draw for the mall. There are currently no anchors in the mall. There are vacant anchor spaces left by Macy's, Marshalls, Nordstrom, and Sears. Junior anchors include Barnes & Noble and Ross Dress for Less.

History
Ideas for Lloyd Center were conceived as early as 1923.  The mall was named after southern Californian oil company executive Ralph B. Lloyd (1875–1953) who wished to build an area of self-sufficiency that included stores and residential locations.  However, the mall wasn't built until 37 years later, due to major events such as the Great Depression and World War II, as well as Portland's conservative anti-development attitude.

1960–1988

The mall opened August 1, 1960 in a 100-store, open-air configuration. At the time, it was the largest shopping center in the Pacific Northwest and claimed to be the largest in the country. In 1960, Lloyd Center was located very close to the downtown retail core and was the first major retail development to seriously challenge it, aimed almost exclusively at commuters utilizing Portland's then-growing freeway system, especially the adjacent Banfield Expressway.

The original anchor stores were Meier & Frank at the center, Best's and Nordstrom's Shoes anchoring the west end, J. C. Penney and Woolworth anchoring the east, and J. J. Newberry the north. The Newberry store was the national chain's largest at the time of its opening. The Seattle-based Nordstrom's Shoes chain acquired Best's apparel in 1963 and rebranded all locations as Nordstrom Best in 1967. The Nordstrom nameplate was adopted in 1973.

As of 1971, Lloyd Center's five largest stores were, from largest to smallest, Meier & Frank (314,000 square feet), Newberry's (100,000 sq. ft.), Penney's (97,370 sq. ft.),  F. W. Woolworth (62,734 sq. ft.) and Nordstom Best (52,891 sq. ft.).

The first significant expansion to the mall since its opening in 1960 was made in fall 1972, adding six stores. The  expansion included the addition of a  Lipman's store.

Frederick & Nelson acquired the Lipman's chain in 1979, and the Lloyd Center Lipman's store was renamed Frederick & Nelson.  The store subsequently went through a dizzying succession of owners, nameplates and locations within the mall. It appears that, in 1988, Nordstrom moved into the old Lipmans/Frederick and Nelson building. The Lipmans name was apparently reinstated at a new location in the north end of the mall in 1987, only to be replaced by that of Spokane-based The Crescent later in the same year. In March 1988, the store was acquired by Bellevue, Washington-based Lamonts.

1988–present: Renovation and new look, subsequent decline

By 1987, the mall was aging and enclosed malls were becoming the norm across the United States. Between 1988 and 1991 the mall was gradually renovated. Nordstrom ended up demolishing the Lipmans store and opening an entirely new location on its space in August 1990.  The former Nordstrom spaces had been gutted and refitted as inline stores, followed by a mall-wide renovation around late 1990-early 1991 which fully enclosed the mall and added a food court. The remodeled shopping hub was rededicated in August 1991. 

Glimcher Realty Trust bought the center in 1998 for $167 million. 

JCPenney closed in June 1998 and was replaced by Sears in November 1999. The Newberry's store, the last in Oregon, closed in 2001, when the entire chain went out of business.  Macy's replaced Meier & Frank in 2006. 

Glimcher Realty Trust sold 60% of the center to Blackstone Real Estate Partners in 2010 after a deal to sell the entire mall fell through the year before. Lloyd Center was sold by Glimcher to Cypress Equities Real Estate Investment Management in June 2013.

In February 2014, it was announced that Nordstrom would be closing its Lloyd Center store effective January 10, 2015.

An 18-month, $50 million renovation began in March 2015, alongside the closure of the Regal 8 cinema. Entrances to the mall will be made more pedestrian-friendly and the central space will be reconfigured with a spiral staircase. The changes are partially in response to the increasing population of the Lloyd District from newly constructed apartment buildings.

In August 2016, Sears sold its  space to the mall's owners, who were reported to be planning a major remodeling of its upper floors, demolishing the fourth floor and expanding the third floor.  On January 4, 2018, Sears announced that its Lloyd Center store would be closing in early April 2018 as part of a plan to close 103 stores nationwide.

In January 2019, it was reported that Marshalls would be closing later that month. 

On November 17, 2020, Macy's announced it would be closing in January 2021. After the closure of Macy's, no traditional anchor stores remain in the mall.

On January 12, 2021, Old Navy announced that the Lloyd Center store would permanently close by the end of January. After the Old Navy closure, the first floor of the mall from the former Sears and the former Marshalls to the former Payless Shoe Source would be completely empty with vacant storefronts.

On August 6, 2021, a two-alarm fire started in the mall's basement, damaging the mall's electrical system. The mall was closed for over three weeks while repairs were made. 

On November 1, 2021, it was reported by local media that KKR Real Estate Finance Trust would be foreclosing on Lloyd Center by the end of the year due to payments on its $110 million debt loan not having been made since October 2020. It was stated that a comprehensive redevelopment of the site was to be considered.

Lloyd Center Ice Rink
Opening in 1960, the Lloyd Center Ice Rink was the world's first open-air shopping center rink. The open-air rink was widely popular, drawing millions of visitors in its first two years, and still is the mall's biggest attraction.
The Ice Rink has attracted a few notable guests over the years. Actor Jim Backus, the voice of Mr. Magoo, once did a couple's routine with a bear. Robert F. Kennedy and his wife Ethel, circled Lloyd's ice just a month before his assassination in June, 1968. Disgraced Olympic figure skater Tonya Harding, at age 3, first learned to skate at the Lloyd Center rink.

The Open-air Ice Rink was covered when the mall went from an open-air configuration to an atrium roof design in the 1990s. 
The rink was reduced in size in 2014 from a standard rectangular rink design to a smaller oval shape. This was part of a larger plan to increase floor space for the eventual plan to attract mobile vendors and food carts, a plan which was never completed.

Public transit

Lloyd Center is accessible by TriMet's MAX light rail service, which stops one block south of the mall, at the Lloyd Center/Northeast 11th Avenue station. The area is also served by several bus stops around the mall facility. The Portland Streetcar's A Loop has a stop two blocks west of the Lloyd Center, at NE 7th & Halsey. C-Tran serves Lloyd Center with its commuter express route 157 from 99th Street Transit Center in Vancouver.

Court cases
Lloyd Center has played a role in the history of freedom of speech in the United States, especially with regard to the scope of free speech within private shopping centers.  Lloyd Center was the defendant in the landmark cases of Lloyd Corp. v. Tanner, a decision of the U.S. Supreme Court involving First Amendment rights and private property, and Lloyd Corp. v. Whiffen, 307 Or. 674, 773 P.2d 1293 (1989), a decision of the Oregon Supreme Court.

See also
 Joe Brown's Carmel Corn
 List of shopping malls in Oregon

References

External links 

 
 Lloyd Center Ice Rink Ice rink website

1960 establishments in Oregon
Lloyd District, Portland, Oregon
Northeast Portland, Oregon
Shopping centers in Portland, Oregon
Shopping malls established in 1960
Washington Prime Group